Kimberly Lim Wei Yan (born 10 December 1994) is a Singaporean netball player who represents Singapore internationally and plays in the positions of wing attack or centre. She was part of the Singaporean squads during the 2015 Netball World Cup and 2019 Netball World Cup. She was just one of two survivors along with skipper Charmaine Soh in the 2019 World Cup squad to have played in the 2015 World Cup.

Education 
Lim studied at the Singapore Sports School.

Netball career 
Lim was a member of the Singaporean team which emerged as champions during the 2014 Asian Netball Championships defeating Sri Lanka at home. Lim was also part of the team which won silver at the 2014 Netball Singapore Nations Cup.

Lim was one of the key members of the Singaporean contingent which claimed gold medal in the women's netball event during 2015 Southeast Asian Games and was part of the Singaporean squad which bagged silver at the 2017 Southeast Asian Games.

In September 2019, she was included in the Singaporean squad for the 2019 M1 Nations Cup.

References 

1994 births
Living people
Singaporean netball players
Southeast Asian Games gold medalists for Singapore
Southeast Asian Games silver medalists for Singapore
2019 Netball World Cup players
Singaporean sportspeople of Chinese descent
21st-century Singaporean women